Union Theatre may refer to:

 Union Theatre, London, England                                               
 Union Theatre, Melbourne, at the University of Melbourne
 Union Theatre (Peterborough), Ontario, Canada, in existence 1989–1996

See also
 Union Square Theatre, New York
 Union-Theater, Berlin, Germany
 Union Theatres

Lists of theatres